BX, Bx, and similar may refer to:

Businesses and organizations 
 Barnard's Express, a transportation company in British Columbia, Canada
 Base exchange, a store operated by the Army, Naval, and Air Force Exchange Service
 Berne eXchange, the stock exchange of Bern, Switzerland
 Blackstone Group (NYSE stock ticker symbol BX)
 BookCrossing, a program for sharing second-hand books
 Air Busan (established 2007) (IATA airline code BX)
 Coast Air (1998–2008) (IATA airline code BX)

Vehicles 
 BX (sternwheeler), a boat owned by Barnard's Express
 Citroën BX, an automobile
 Bionix AFV, an infantry fighting vehicle produced in Singapore

Science and technology

Biology and medicine
 Biopsy, the extraction of cells or tissues to determine the presence or extent of a disease
 Biosimilar, an identical copy of a biologic medication manufactured by a different company
 Bithorax (part of bithorax complex), a genetic mutation in flies

Computing
 BX register, a general-purpose 16-bit X86 register
 BitchX, an IRC client
 Intel 440BX, chipset for Pentium II/Pentium III/III and Celeron processors
 Bidirectional transformations

Other uses in science and technology
 BX cable, a genericized trademark term for a type of AC armoured electrical cable
 BeppoSAX catalog, also called SAX and 1SAX
 Brix (°Bx), measurement unit of the dissolved sugar-to-water mass ratio of a liquid

Places 
 Belgium, World Meteorological Organization country code
 BeNeLux, a politico-economic union of Belgium, the Netherlands, and Luxembourg
 Berryessa, San Jose, California
 Bordeaux, France
 The Bronx, one of the five boroughs of The City of New York, New York, U.S. (also for many institutions, usually in the borough, and named for it)
 Brunei (FIPS Pub 10-4 and obsolete NATO country code)

Other uses 
 BX convoys of World War II ships
 Battlecross, a rock band from Michigan